Demolition Racer is a vehicular combat racing video game for the PlayStation, Dreamcast, and PC developed by Pitbull Syndicate and published by Infogrames North America.

Gameplay
The game combines destruction and driving tactics in a fast-paced racing environment. It is very similar to the Destruction Derby series. The PC version contained slightly better in-game graphics than the PlayStation version, and included varied weather and times of day. Drivers are given (optional) wacky portraits which displayed on the side of the screen in a race, showing who's ahead of who.

The game was re-released for the Dreamcast as Demolition Racer: No Exit, which featured new tracks, new cars, unlockable mini games, and an additional mode called "No Exit", which plays the same as Last Man Standing in the other games. In No Exit's version of Last Man Standing, the player must now try to survive as long as possible. The game was also redesigned and enhanced. For example, the graphics were upgraded (same goes for the HUD and menus), the levels now have ambient sound effects (such as crowds cheering), and all of the drivers' cars are also shown on the results screen in what condition they were left with at the end of a race.

Development
On 15 March 1999, the game was announced by Accolade.

Reception

Demolition Racer: No Exit received "generally favourable reviews" according to the review aggregation website Metacritic. Jeff Lundrigan of NextGen said of the PlayStation version in its November 1999 issue, "Although this game has some 'modern' enhancements like shortcuts (which seem sort of pasted in), the game mechanics might as well have been transplanted whole and bleeding from Destruction Derby," and warned the reader to "Steer clear of this smoking wreck." A year later, however, he wrote that No Exit "still isn't living up to its potential, but it's a fun title nonetheless."

References

External links
Pitbull Syndicate page

1999 video games
Infogrames games
Dreamcast games
PlayStation (console) games
Racing video games
Vehicular combat games
Video games developed in the United Kingdom
Windows games
Multiplayer and single-player video games